Department of Railways under Ministry of Physical Infrastructure and Transport is the authority to develop, maintain and plan railways in Nepal. It has its headquarter at Bishalnagar, Kathmandu. Currently it maintains two in-operation railway lines in the country: Raxaul–Sirsiya and the Jainagar–Janakpur. It has several lines been planned.

Existing Railway
Currently there are two operational railway lines in the country: 

Raxaul–Sirsiya line: 
This is a  line from Raxaul, India to Sirsiya Inland Container Depot (or dry port) near Birganj, Nepal, and is primarily used for freight transport. It allows container traffic to be imported to Nepal through the Sirsiya dry port container depot.  

Jainagar–Janakpur line: This is a  line from Jainagar, India to Janakpur, Nepal, and is used primarily for passenger transport. This is the only passenger transport railway line in Nepal. It connects Janakpur to Siraha at the Nepal-India border and further goes to the Indian town of Jainagar, Bihar. Nepal Railways operates passenger train service on it.

Planned Railway
Railway Department has following lines under planned railways to be develop in future.
 Anbu Khaireni-Bharatpur - The feasibility study has done and railway will be constructed to link Kathmandu and Pokhara with the Mechi-Mahakali or the East-West Railway.
 Jainagar-Janakpur–Bijayalpura-Bardibas: The Jainagar–Janakpur line is being extended further to Bardibas from Janakpur.
 Kerung-Kathmandu: The railway will connect the capital city with China and the estimated cost is $2.75 billion. A 23-member technical and administrative team of National Railway Administration of China, led by its vice minister Zheng Jian contucted a four-day overall study.
 Lumbini-Pokhara-Kathmandu: This will connect the popular tourist destination and adventureous city with the capital and the estimated cost is $3 billion.
 Raxaul–Birgunj-Kathmandu: Nepal and India agreed to construct a railway line linking Raxaul with Kathmandu during Prime Minister KP Oli Sharma's visit to India. A team of technical officers visited Kathmandu to study the proposed railway and they have stated that a feasibility study of the project would begin. They have already identified Chobhar as the terminus of the 113 km long railway line.
 New Jalpaiguri (India) – Kakarbhitta (Nepal)
 Bathnaha (India)- Jogbani (India) – Biratnagar (Nepal)
 Nautanwa (India) – Bhairahawa (Nepal)
 Rupaidiha,Nepalganj Road (India) – Nepalganj (Nepal)

References

Rail transport in Nepal
Government agencies of Nepal